Orochen 2-y is a rural locality (a selo), one of three settlements, in addition to Aldan, the administrative centre of the settlement and Bolshoy Nimnyr in the Town of Aldan of Olyokminsky District in the Sakha Republic, Russia. Its population as of the 2010 Census was 16; down from 29 recorded in the 2002 Census.

References

Notes

Sources
 Official website of the Sakha Republic. Registry of the Administrative-Territorial Divisions of the Sakha Republic. Aldansky District. 
 

Rural localities in Aldansky District